Darren Paul Jones (born 13 November 1986) is a British Labour politician serving as Chair of the House of Commons Business, Energy and Industrial Strategy Committee since 2020. He also sits on the National Security Strategy Joint Committee and the Liaison Committee, which scrutinises the work of the Prime Minister. He has been the Member of Parliament for Bristol North West since 2017.

Early life and education 

Jones was born in his constituency of Bristol North West and grew up in Lawrence Weston. He attended Portway Community School in Shirehampton, a state comprehensive, before studying human bioscience at the University of Plymouth, where he was subsequently elected President of the Students' Union. Jones worked in the National Health Service and served on the boards of the University of Plymouth and the Plymouth NHS Trust, and had a weekly newspaper column in the Plymouth Herald. He later studied law at the University of the West of England and the University of Law in Bristol before being admitted as a solicitor.

Legal career 

Jones specialises in technology law, and initially worked at Womble Bond Dickinson LLP, before becoming an in-house counsel with BT, advising on data, privacy, cyber-security, telecommunications and consumer law.

In Bristol, Jones started a successful mentoring programme seeking to bring young people from his old school into the legal profession. He later chaired the Young Lawyers' Network, a nationwide group campaigning for a vote to remain in the European Union in the 2016 referendum, and sat on the board of UK Legal Futures, which brought together leading lawyers to advise politicians and civil servants on legal questions raised by Brexit.

Early political career 

Jones first fought a general election as Labour's candidate in Conservative-held Torridge and West Devon at the 2010 general election. Jones later sat on the national youth committees of the Co-operative Party and Unite the Union and was elected to Unite's Regional Political Committee in the South West. In 2012 Jones was selected to contest his home constituency of Bristol North West, which had been gained by the Conservatives in 2010 with Labour falling into third place. Although he increased the Labour vote share by eight percent, the incumbent MP Charlotte Leslie was re-elected on the back of a national swing to the Conservatives.

Following the 2015 election, Jones joined the campaign of Labour leadership hopeful Andy Burnham as its South West Co-ordinator, and chaired Marvin Rees' successful campaign to become Mayor of Bristol. In 2016 he joined the Remain campaign in the EU membership referendum and later worked for the Clinton campaign in Miami during that year's US Presidential election.

Parliamentary career and political positions 

At the 2017 general election, Jones was elected the Member of Parliament for Bristol North West, overturning a Conservative majority of 4,944 on a 9.2 percent swing. In his maiden speech, Jones noted that he was the first Darren ever elected to Parliament. Between 2017 and 2020, Jones was a member of the cross-party Science and Technology Committee and the European Scrutiny Committee. In 2019, then Deputy Leader of the Labour Party, Tom Watson, appointed Jones as the Convenor of the Future Britain Group, which was established following a number of defections from the Labour Party in a bid to prevent further defections.

Parliamentary Labour Party 
Jones was re-elected at the 2019 general election, increasing his majority at an election which saw a significant nationwide swing away from the Labour Party. Following Keir Starmer's election as Labour leader in April 2020, Jones was appointed Parliamentary Private Secretary jointly to Shadow Justice Secretary David Lammy and Shadow Attorney General Charlie Falconer, and served until his election as Chair of the House of Commons Business, Energy and Industrial Strategy Committee.

Jones is also the chair of Labour Digital, a Labour think tank.

Business, Energy and Industrial Strategy Select Committee 
Through his select committee work, Jones has led on issues related to the economy, business and jobs as well as national security and climate change.

Jones has been a prominent campaigner for a number of labour disputes, including the withholding of redundancy payments from Astra Zeneca workers, the campaign to increase miners' pensions through the Mineworkers Pension Scheme, the historic miscarriage of justice behind the British Post Office scandal, the right for workers to join a trade union at Amazon and the dispute related to changes at Royal Mail.

Jones introduced the UK's first citizens assembly on net zero to Parliament  and has led Parliamentary inquiries into the decarbonisation of heating, electricity  and industry, as well as reform of the energy market in the United Kingdom.

Jones sits on the National Security Strategy Joint Committee and, following the introduction of the National Security and Investment Act 2021, became responsible as Chair of the Business, Energy and Industrial Strategy Committee for holding the Government to account for its use of national security powers.

A prominent member of the Liaison Committee, Jones had frequent notable exchanges with former Prime Minister Boris Johnson, including during the final days of his premiership when Jones informed Johnson that his cabinet was waiting for him in No 10 Downing Street to tell him to resign.

In Parliament 
In 2021, Jones passed the Forensic Science Regulator Act 2021, having been successful in the ballot for a Private Members Bill, giving the forensic science regulator statutory powers to ensure service quality standards from the privatised forensic science companies working with the police.

Jones has been recognised as a leading voice on technology policy. In 2019 he co-chaired a Parliamentary inquiry into technology ethics. He leads the Parliamentary Internet, Communications and Technology Forum  and the Data Poverty  and Technology and National Security All Party Parliamentary Groups. In January 2021, during the Covid pandemic, he introduced a Ten Minute Rule Bill seeking to force internet service providers to offer a social tariff to families in receipt of Universal Credit. Jones is the founder and chair of the Interparliamentary Forum on Emerging Technologies, a global network of legislators interested in emerging technology regulation, and in 2021 was appointed to the Online Safety Bill pre-legislative scrutiny committee.

In 2022, Jones was appointed as a member of the UK-EU Parliamentary Partnership Assembly  which was established under the terms of the 2021 Trade and Co-operation Agreement between the UK and the EU and acts as a forum for parliamentarians to exchange views on the implementation and operation of the Agreement.

Personal life 

Jones is married to net zero consultant and technology entrepreneur Lucy Symons-Jones, who co-founded the renewable energy company Village Infrastructure. They have two daughters.

Jones became a vegan in 2014, for reasons related to carbon emissions and agriculture, although he is sometimes vegetarian. He has described Tony Blair as one of his political heroes.

References

External links
Official website, archived on 8 June 2017

1986 births
Living people
21st-century English lawyers
Alumni of the University of Plymouth
British Telecom people
English solicitors
Labour Friends of Israel
Labour Party (UK) MPs for English constituencies
Politics of Bristol
UK MPs 2017–2019
UK MPs 2019–present